The Strub Stakes is an American race for thoroughbred horses run at Santa Anita Park in Arcadia, California each year.

Currently a Grade II stakes race with a purse of $200,000, it is for four-year-olds, at one and one-eighth miles on Santa Anita Park's dirt track. Run in early February, the race is the third leg of Santa Anita Park's Strub Series.

Inaugurated in 1948 as the Santa Anita Maturity, the name was changed to the Charles H. Strub Stakes in 1963 in honor of Charles H. Strub (1884–1958) who built and owned Santa Anita Park. In 1994 the billing was shortened to the Strub Stakes to honor both Dr. Strub and Dr. Strub's son, Robert P. Strub, who succeeded Dr. Strub as CEO at Santa Anita and had died the previous May.

From 1948 to 1969 and from 1971 to 1997 the race was contested at  miles.

Records
Speed  record:
 1:47.25 - Mizzen Mast (2002)
 1:57.80 - Spectacular Bid (1980 at  miles)

Most wins by a jockey:
 7 - Bill Shoemaker (1951, 1961, 1964, 1966, 1972, 1975, 1980)

Most wins by a trainer:
 5 - Bob Baffert (1998, 2000, 2001, 2013, 2014)

Most wins by an owner:
 3 - Golden Eagle Farm (1992, 1999, 2000)

Winners of the Strub Stakes

* † Miz Clementine (1955) and Nodouble (1969) both finished first but after a stewards' inquiry were disqualified to second place.

References

Graded stakes races in the United States
Horse races in California
Open mile category horse races
Santa Anita Park
Recurring sporting events established in 1948
1948 establishments in California